Events called the Hong Kong Open include:

 Hong Kong Open (badminton), a badminton tournament held in Hong Kong since 1982
 Hong Kong Open (golf), a golf tournament which is co-sanctioned by the Asian Tour and the European Tour
 Hong Kong Open (snooker), a professional snooker tournament only held in 1989. 
 Hong Kong Open (squash) a squash tournament held annually.
 Hong Kong Open (tennis), a tennis tournament held in Hong Kong on the Grand Prix tour (1973-1987), ATP Tour (1990-2002), and WTA Tour (2014-present).
 Hong Kong Open (table tennis), a table tennis tournament held for the first time in 2018.
 Hong Kong Open (darts), a darts tournament that began in 2005.